Judianne Densen-Gerber (November 13, 1934 Manhattan, New York - May 11, 2003, Manhattan) was a psychiatrist, lawyer, and educator who “dedicated her professional life to fighting substance abuse, child abuse, battery of women and pornography.”

Biography
Born to parents Gustave Gerber, a chemical engineer and Beatrice Densen, an heiress, she graduated from Bryn Mawr College in 1956, Columbia Law School (JD (1959), and New York University (MD 1963).  She died in her sleep from cancer. Until 1997, she was married to pathologist Michael Baden.  At the time of her death, she was a resident of Westport, Connecticut.

Career
Considered a pioneer in the area of the Therapeutic community, she founded Odyssey House while working as a resident psychiatrist at Metropolitan Hospital.  Despite her success in getting government funding, in 1983 she resigned her position as executive director after a state investigation found financial irregularities.

Publications
Odyssey House: A Structural Model for the Successful Employment and Re-Entry of the Ex-Drug Abuser Volume: 4 issue: 4, page(s): 414-427, Issue published: October 1, 1974 Judianne Densen-Gerber, J. D., M. D., David Drassner, M.S., Ed.M. https://doi.org/10.1177/002204267400400413
Drugs, sex, parents, and you

References

1934 births
2003 deaths
American women psychiatrists
American women lawyers
American lawyers
American women educators
Bryn Mawr College alumni
Columbia Law School alumni
New York University alumni
People from Manhattan
People from Westport, Connecticut
Deaths from cancer in New York (state)
21st-century American women